Heart is a 1999 British thriller film directed by Charles McDougall.

Cast
Saskia Reeves - Maria Ann McCardle
Christopher Eccleston - Gary Ellis
Kate Hardie - Tess Ellis
Rhys Ifans - Alex Madden
Anna Chancellor - Nicola Farmer
Matthew Rhys - Sean McCardle
Jack Deam - Policeman
Kate Rutter - Sister Mary
Nicholas Moss - Doctor
Bill Paterson - Mr. Kreitman

References

External links 

1999 films
British thriller drama films
Films shot in Greater Manchester
1990s English-language films
1990s British films